Augusto Marcelo Vantomme (born 23 June 1990) is an Argentine professional footballer who plays as a goalkeeper for FK Jonava.

Career
Vantomme had youth stints with San Lorenzo, Banfield, Independiente and Sportivo Italiano before beginning his senior career with Victoriano Arenas in 2011. He remained with the Primera D Metropolitana club for three years whilst appearing fifty-five times. In 2015, Vantomme completed a move to Primera C Metropolitana's San Miguel. Thirty appearances followed across his first three seasons, with the club winning promotion to Primera B Metropolitana in the latter. His professional bow subsequently came during a 1–1 home draw versus San Telmo. Ahead of the 2018–19 Primera B Nacional campaign, Vantomme joined Ferro Carril Oeste.

Career statistics
.

References

External links

1990 births
Living people
Footballers from Buenos Aires
Argentine footballers
Association football goalkeepers
Primera D Metropolitana players
Primera C Metropolitana players
Primera B Metropolitana players
Victoriano Arenas players
Club Atlético San Miguel footballers
Ferro Carril Oeste footballers
Club Atlético Acassuso footballers